Segovia is a province of central/northern Spain, in the southern part of the autonomous community of Castile and León. It is bordered by the province of Burgos in the north, Soria in the northeast, Guadalajara in the east, Madrid in the south, Ávila in the west and southwest, and Valladolid in the northwest. The average temperature ranges from 10 °C to 20 °C.

Overview 

The province has a population of 149,286, of whom about 35% live in the capital, Segovia. Of the 209 municipalities in the province, more than half are villages with under 200 people.

The name Segovia is said to be of Celtiberian origin, but also thought to be derived from the  conquest and occupation of Castile by the Visigoths, a Scandinavian / Germanic tribe living in Castile from the 4th to 6th centuries AD. The provincial corporation consists of 25 elected members. After the recent elections there are 10 members of the Spanish Socialist Workers Party and 15 of the People's Party. The historical heritage of this province is rich and varied. The capital city has the 800-metre-long Roman Aqueduct of Segovia, which is unique to the province. The capital was declared a world heritage site in 1985. Sepúlveda, Ayllón, Pedraza, Coca and La Granja de San Ildefonso villages attract a large number of tourists. La Granja de San Ildefonso houses a national monument–The Royal Palace. Antonio Machado's house is located in Ayllón. Tourism is one of the most important industries. In July 2014, the provincial government signed an agreement with Bankia which will contribute 10,000 euros to promote the province's tourism industry. Agriculture also contributes significantly to the province's Gross Domestic Product. Wheat, barley, rye and rice have been the most important cereals. During the seventeenth century many of the province's towns recorded decline in cereal production. Cattle rearing is also an important commercial activity.

Population development
The historical population is given in the following chart:

See also 

 List of municipalities in Segovia

Notes and references

External links 

 
Provinces of Castile and León